Thomas Neill Duggan (born 1940), is a male former athlete who competed for England.

Athletics career
Duggan was selected by England to represent his country in athletics events.

He represented England in the 1 mile race, at the 1966 British Empire and Commonwealth Games in Kingston, Jamaica.

He was a member of the Sparkhill Harriers Athletics Club in Birmingham. He held a scholarship at Allan Hancock College, California and set a United States national junior college mile record of 4 min. 2.7 sec.

He also holds fast times on the all time UK list for 1500 metres and 1 mile. (3:41.6 and 3:56.1) respectively.

References

1940 births
English male middle-distance runners
Athletes (track and field) at the 1966 British Empire and Commonwealth Games
Living people
Commonwealth Games competitors for England